The Protestant Church of Djibouti was established in 1960 by the army chaplains of the French troops. After independence the church buildings became the property of the Federation of Protestant Churches. The single parish developed rapidly, regular worship lives and Bible schools were created, and they supported refugee work. The Protestant Church of Djibouti houses in its worship life Christians from various countries (Congo, France, Burundi, United States) as well as various confessions (Reformed, Lutheran, Baptist, Adventist, Mennonite).

References

Christian organizations established in 1960
Churches in Djibouti
Reformed denominations in Africa
1960 establishments in French Somaliland